Colinton/Fairmilehead is one of the seventeen wards used to elect members of the City of Edinburgh Council. Established in 2007 along with the other wards, it elects three Councillors.

As its name suggests, the ward's territory is based around the communities of Colinton and Fairmilehead in the far south of the city's urban area up to the boundary with Midlothian, also including Bonaly, Comiston, Firrhill, Hunter's Tryst / New Swanston, Oxgangs and Redford, plus the separate hamlet of Swanston. In 2019, the ward had a population of 25,257.

Councillors

Election Results

2017 Election
2017 City of Edinburgh Council election

2012 Election
2012 City of Edinburgh Council election

2007 Election
2007 City of Edinburgh Council election

References

External links
Listed Buildings in Colinton/Fairmilehead Ward, City of Edinburgh at British Listed Buildings

Wards of Edinburgh